KJMG (or Majic 97) is a Defunct FM radio station broadcasting at 97.3 MHz. The station is licensed to Bastrop, LA. The station Airs urban adult contemporary radio format. KJMG Was owned by KP Music Group, LLC.   The Studios Were located in Monroe, and its transmitter Was located east of Sterlington, Louisiana.

History
KJMG Majic 97 (97.3 FM) is urban adult contemporary. KJMG Had leaned more heavily on Throwback Hip Hop and R&B from the 90's and Early 2000

See also
List of radio stations in Louisiana

External links
Majic 97 official website

Radio stations in Louisiana
Urban adult contemporary radio stations in the United States